Dodging a Million is a 1918 American comedy film starring Mabel Normand and Tom Moore, directed by George Loane Tucker, written by A. M. Kennedy, Edgar Selwyn, and Loane, and photographed by Oliver T. Marsh. The black and white silent film was released by the Goldwyn Pictures Corporation. It is not known whether the film currently survives, and it may be a lost film.

Plot
As described in a film magazine, employed as a mannequin, Arabella Flynn (Normand) decides to have one good time and so with gown and coat belonging to her employer she goes to a fashionable restaurant where she attracts the attention of Jack Forsythe (Moore). During her meal her employer comes into the place so Arabella rushes pell mell into the street. Arriving at her boarding house, she finds that she has fallen heir to a fortune. She immediately goes to a fashionable hotel where, because of her inheritance, she is the center of attention. After several fashionable shops have given her their wares and extended unlimited credit, they learn a mistake has been made in her check and flock immediately to her hotel to demand payment. In the midst of her trouble Arabella learns that the only mistake made is in the size of her check. After she has reassured her creditors, she agrees to become the wife of Jack.

Cast 
Mabel Normand as Arabella Flynn
Tom Moore as Jack Forsythe
J. Herbert Frank as Signor Rodrigues
Shirley Aubert as Forelady
Rita Dane as Luella
Norah Sprague as Luella's Friend
Bruce Biddle as Lawyer's Clerk
Armand Cortes as Raquin

References

External links

 
 Dodging a Million at Turner Classic Movies

1918 films
American silent short films
American black-and-white films
Silent American comedy films
1918 comedy films
1918 short films
American comedy short films
Films directed by George Loane Tucker
1910s American films